David Murray Horner,  (born 12 March 1948) is an Australian military historian and academic.

Early life and military career
Horner was born in Adelaide, South Australia, on 12 March 1948. He was raised in a military household—his father, Murray Horner, had served in New Guinea during the Second World War. Like Murray, David Horner attended Prince Alfred College. Horner was a prefect and served on numerous committees including the yearbook, debating, cadets, and student christian movement.

later joined the Citizen Military Forces—and joined the Australian Army after completing school in 1966. On graduating from the Royal Military College, Duntroon in 1969, he was commissioned a lieutenant in the Royal Australian Infantry Corps. In 1971, Horner served an eight-month tour in Vietnam as a platoon commander in the 3rd Battalion, Royal Australian Regiment. He was a visiting fellow with the Department of History at the Australian Defence Force Academy from 1985 to 1988, and a member of the directing staff at the Joint Services Staff College in 1988 to 1990. Horner retired from the full-time army in 1991 on gaining a position with the Australian National University (ANU) and transferred to the Australian Army Reserve, with which he served for more than a decade. He was the inaugural commanding officer of the Land Warfare Studies Centre (1998–2002), and retired with the rank of colonel.

Horner has a Diploma of Military Studies from Duntroon, a Master of Arts (Honours) from the University of New South Wales, and graduated with a Doctor of Philosophy from the ANU in 1980. His doctoral thesis, supervised by Robert O'Neill and completed while a serving major in the army, concerned Australian and Allied strategy in the Pacific War and formed the basis for his second book, High Command: Australia and Allied Strategy, 1939–1945 (1982).

Historian and academic
Horner was appointed to a position at the ANU's Strategic and Defence Studies Centre in 1990. In 1998 he was described as "one of Australia's most respected military historians", and in 1999 was made Professor of Australian Defence History at the ANU's Research School of Pacific and Asian Studies (later the Coral Bell School of Asia Pacific Affairs); a role he served in until 2014.

In 2004 Horner was appointed the Official Historian and general editor for the Official History of Australian Peacekeeping, Humanitarian and Post-Cold War Operations, a six-volume history covering Australia's involvement in international peacekeeping operations from 1947 to 2006. Horner authored or co-authored the second and third volumes: Australia and the 'New World Order''' (2011) and, with John Connor, The Good International Citizen (2014). A team led by Horner also won a tender to write the official history of the Australian Security Intelligence Organisation (ASIO). The three-volume series, which traces the first forty years of ASIO's history from 1949 to 1989, was led by Horner's The Spy Catchers (2014). John Blaxland's The Protest Years followed in 2015, and Blaxland and Rhys Crawley's The Secret Cold War in 2016. The Spy Catchers jointly won the Prime Minister's Literary Award for Australian History, was sole winner of the St Ermin's Hotel Intelligence Book of the Year Award, and was long-listed for the Council for the Humanities, Arts and Social Sciences Australia Prize for a Book in 2015. Horner also undertook a feasibility study in 2012 into what eventually became the Official History of Australian Operations in Iraq and Afghanistan, and Australian Peacekeeping Operations in East Timor''.

Horner has written or edited 32 books and more than 75 journal articles, reports and chapters in books. In 2009, he was appointed a Member of the Order of Australia for his "service to higher education in the area of Australian military history and heritage as a researcher, author and academic." Horner retired from full-time academia in 2014, and was appointed an emeritus professor at the ANU. He was made a Fellow of the Academy of the Social Sciences in Australia in 2015.

Bibliography

Books

Edited books

References

Citations

Sources 

 Australian War Memorial Peacekeeping Official History

1948 births
Australian colonels
Australian military historians
Australian military personnel of the Vietnam War
Australian National University alumni
Academic staff of the Australian National University
Fellows of the Academy of the Social Sciences in Australia
Living people
Members of the Order of Australia
People from Adelaide
Royal Military College, Duntroon graduates
University of New South Wales alumni
Military personnel from South Australia